Toes are the digits of the foot of a human or animal.

Toes or TOES may also refer to:

 "Toes" (Zac Brown Band song), 2009
 "Toes" (Lights song), 2011
 "Toes", a song by Glass Animals from the 2014 album Zaba.
 "Toes", a song by DaBaby featuring Lil Baby and Moneybagg Yo from the 2019 album Kirk
 The Other Economic Summit, a counter-summit to the annual G7 summits

See also

 Toe (disambiguation)
 Toos (disambiguation)
 Tows